The fifth season of musical reality show The Voice of Kazakhstan (Kazakh :  Qazaqstan дауысы / Qazaqstan Dauisi) premiered on September 4, 2021. This is the revival of the show after the four year absence to the country's television and the airing of the program once again commissioned by Qazaqstan TV  after the airing of its season four to Perviy Kanal Evraziya.

With the new season, new coaches and presenters are in line. Alem, Arapbayeva Marzhan, Mayra Muhammad and Saken Maigaziyev are the new coaches of the show. Galym Kenshilik and Taukel Musilim are the new presenters.

Quralay Meryambek from Team Saken was proclaimed as the winner of the "Voice of Kazakhstan 2021". With Meryambek's victory, this marks Saken's first win of the show.

Teams

Blind Auditions 
Blind Auditions premiered on September 4, 2021. Coaches must have 16 members on its team at the end of the blind Auditions

The Battles 
The battle rounds began on October 23. Each coach has sixteen artists on their team, narrowing down into pair to sing a song together. No "Steal" were available at this round. Artist who win their respective battle will go through to the next round.

Knockouts 
Knockout Rounds began on November 20. The remaining eight contestant is divided into two batch per episode (quartets). In this round, instead of grouping them into trio or quartets,  there will be two seats available in the backstage. After a contestant performs a song of his or her choice, he or she will sit in one of these seats; this will occur for the first two artists performing on a team.

However, after these first contestants perform, the fate of the third artist will be decided based on whether his or her coach would like to switch out an artist already seated in favor of this performer. In the case of a switch-out, the artist that was switched out will be eliminated, and this performer will sit down. If the coach would instead like to keep the performers already seated and thus not give a seat to this performer, he or she will be immediately eliminated. After all artists in the batch have performed, those who end up seated will advance to the next round. At the end of the round, four artists will be remaining on the team.

Live Shows 
Live Shows aired on Saturdays at 20:40. Each week there is a one contestant would be eliminated per team. Live shows divided into four stages; the Concerts, Quarterfinals, Semi-Finals and the Grand Finale. Although it is broadcast live, three weeks of lives doesn't involve interactive real-time voting, thus, the coaches themselves would determine on who will advance to the next round.

Live Concerts Week 1 (December 4) 
Live Shows begin at Top 16. Each contestant will perform a song for their coach whether to proceed in next phase or not. The show for the week would be concluded by eliminating one contestant out of four.

Week 2 : Quarter-finals (December 11)

Week 3 : Semi-finals (December 18)

Week 4 : The Grand Finale (December 25)

Elimination Chart

Results Key

Overall Elimination

References 

Kazakhstani television seasons
Kazakhstan